Nottoway Correctional Center is an all-male state prison in Burkeville, Nottoway County, Virginia, USA. A low-security work center is on the same site.

Nottoway, as a Level 3 security facility, has inmates serving long term sentences, including single, multiple, and life sentences. Inmates must exhibit no disruptive behavior for at least 24 months in order to be considered for transfer to a less-secure facility.

References

External links
 Nottoway Correctional Center

Prisons in Virginia
Buildings and structures in Nottoway County, Virginia
1984 establishments in Virginia